HALIBA is an Israeli umbrella organization that describes itself as working "to re-claim for Jews the basic civil rights of free access, free worship, and free congregation on the Temple Mount."

The organization often calls itself "The Temple Mount Heritage Foundation" and is sometimes referred to in news reports as a "Temple movements' coalition" led by Yehuda Glick, or similar phrasing, rather than by the acronym.

HALIBA describes itself as a group dedicated to "reaching complete and comprehensive freedom and civil rights for Jews on the Temple Mount." The group is led by founder Yehuda Glick with Linda Olmert as deputy director.

In a statement published by the Jerusalem Post, HALIBA described its mission as bringing "together a diverse group of Jewish Israelis – secular, haredi, traditional, national religious, men and women – who are united in their concern that the inability of Jews to freely ascend the Mount to pray, meditate or give thanks represents a grievous and indefensible civil rights deprivation to Jews all over the world."

History and activities

HALIBA was established in 2007 by Israel Independence Fund and by the Temple Mount Heritage Foundation. During visits to the Mount, HALIBA director Yehuda Glick has documented and filmed vandalism and illegal construction activity, including Muslim crews "drilling with heavy machinery" at the legally protected site.

References

External links
 Official website

Political organizations based in Israel
2007 establishments in Israel
Organizations established in 2007
Organizations based in Jerusalem
Foundations based in Israel
Temple Mount
Jewish organizations based in Israel
Israeli activists